A church service (or a service of worship) is a formalized period of Christian communal worship, often held in a church building. It often but not exclusively occurs on Sunday, or Saturday in the case of those churches practicing seventh-day Sabbatarianism. The church service is the gathering together of Christians to be taught the "Word of God" (the Christian Bible) and encouraged in their faith. Technically, the "church" in "church service" refers to the gathering of the faithful rather than to the building in which it takes place. In most Christian traditions, services are presided over by clergy wherever possible. Styles of service vary greatly, from the Anglican, Eastern Orthodox, Oriental Orthodox, Presbyterian, Roman Catholic, and Lutheran traditions of liturgical worship to the evangelical Protestant style, that often combines worship with teaching for the believers, which may also have an evangelistic component appealing to the non-Christians or skeptics in the congregation. Quakers and some other groups have no formal outline to their services, but allow the worship to develop as the participants present feel moved. The majority of Christian denominations hold church services on the Lord's Day (with many offering Sunday morning and Sunday evening services); a number of traditions have mid-week Wednesday evening services as well. In some Christian denominations, church services are held daily, with these including those in which the canonical hours are prayed, as well as the offering of the Mass, among other forms of worship. In addition to this, many Christians attend services on holy days such as Christmas, Ash Wednesday, Good Friday, Ascension Thursday, among others depending on the Christian denomination.

History

 
The worship service is a practice of Christian life that has its origins in the Jewish worship. Jesus Christ and Paul of Tarsus taught a new form of worship of God. As recorded in the gospels, Jesus met together with His disciples to share teachings, discuss topics, pray, and sing hymns. The holding of church services pertains to the observance of the Lord's Day in Christianity. The Bible has a precedent for a pattern of morning and evening worship that has given rise to Sunday morning and Sunday evening services of worship held in the churches of many Christian denominations today, a "structure to help families sanctify the Lord’s Day." In Psalm 92, which is a prayer concerning the observance of the Sabbath, the prophet David writes "It is good to give thanks to the Lord, to sing praises to your name, O Most High; to declare your steadfast love in the morning, and your faithfulness by night" (cf.  ). Church father Eusebius of Caesarea thus declared: "For it is surely no small sign of God’s power that throughout the whole world in the churches of God at the morning rising of the sun and at the evening hours, hymns, praises, and truly divine delights are offered to God. God’s delights are indeed the hymns sent up everywhere on earth in his Church at the times of morning and evening." The first miracle of the Apostles, the healing of the crippled man on the temple steps, occurred because Peter and John went to the Temple to pray (Acts 3:1). Since the Apostles were originally Jews, see Jewish Christians, the concept of fixed prayer times, as well as services therefore which differed from weekday to Sabbath to holy day, were familiar to them. Pliny the Younger (63 - ca. 113), who was not a Christian himself, mentions not only fixed prayer times by believers, but also specific services—other than the Eucharist—assigned to those times: "They met on a stated day before it was light, and addressed a form of prayer to Christ, as to a divinity ... after which it was their custom to separate, and then reassemble, to eat in common a harmless meal." The real evolution of the Christian service in the first century is shrouded in mystery. By the second and third centuries, such Church Fathers as Clement of Alexandria, Origen, and Tertullian wrote of formalised, regular services: the practice of Morning and Evening Prayer, and prayers at the third hour of the day (terce), the sixth hour of the day (sext), and the ninth hour of the day (none). With reference to the Jewish practices, it is surely no coincidence that these major hours of prayer correspond to the first and last hour of the conventional day, and that on Sundays (corresponding to the Sabbath in Christianity), the services are more complex and longer (involving twice as many services if one counts the Eucharist and the afternoon service). Similarly, the liturgical year from Christmas via Easter to Pentecost covers roughly five months, the other seven having no major services linked to the work of Christ. However, this is not to say that the Jewish services were copied or deliberately substituted, see Supersessionism. With respect to attire worn at church services, Christians have historically tended to wear modest clothes (cf. ). Men have traditionally removed their caps while praying and worshipping, while women have traditionally worn a headcovering while praying and worshipping (cf. ). These practices continue to be normative in certain churches, congregations, and denominations, as well as in particular parts of the world, such as in Eastern Europe and in the Indian subcontinent, while in the West, attention to these observances has waned generally (apart from those denominations that continue to require them, such as Conservative Anabaptist churches). In many nondenominational Christian churches, it may be customary, depending on the locality, for people to be dressed casually.

Contemporary church services

Contemporary worship services have their origins in the Jesus Movement of the 1960s. In the 1980s and 1990s, contemporary Christian music, comprising a variety of musical styles, such as Christian rock and Christian hip-hop was adopted by evangelical churches. Over the years, the organs have been replaced by pianos, electric guitars and drums. These contemporary worship services feature a sermon based on the Bible. Worship service in Evangelical churches is seen as an act of God's worship. It is usually run by a Christian pastor. It usually contains two main parts, the praise (Christian music) and the sermon, with periodically the Lord's Supper.
 During worship there is usually a nursery for babies. Prior to the worship service, adults, children and young people receive an adapted education, Sunday school, in a separate room. With the 1960s' charismatic movement, a new conception of praise in worship, such as clapping and raising hands as a sign of worship, took place in many evangelical denominations. In the 1980s and 1990s, contemporary Christian music, including a wide variety of musical styles, such as Christian Rock and Christian Hip Hop, appeared in the praise. In the 2000s and 2010s, digital technologies were integrated into worship services, such as the video projectors for broadcasting praise lyrics or video, on big screens. The use of social media such as YouTube and Facebook to retransmit live or delayed worship services, by Internet, has also spread. The offering via Internet has become a common practice in several churches. In some churches, a special moment is reserved for faith healing with laying on of hands during worship services. Faith healing or divine healing is considered a legacy of Jesus acquired by his death and resurrection. The taking up of tithes and offerings (gifts made beyond the tithe) is a normative part of the worship services. The main Christian feasts celebrated by the Evangelicals are Christmas, Pentecost, and Easter for all believers, among others depending on Christian denominations (cf. evangelical feasts).

Quaker Meeting for Worship

Quakers (the Religious Society of Friends), like other Nonconformist Protestant denominations, distinguish between a church, which is a body of people who believe in Christ, and a 'meeting house' or 'chapel', which is a building where the church meets. Quakers have both unprogrammed and programmed Meetings for Worship. Unprogrammed worship is based on waiting in silence and inward listening to the Spirit, from which any participant may share a message. In unprogrammed meetings for worship, someone speaks when that person feels that God/Spirit/the universe has given them a message for others. Programmed worship includes many elements similar to Protestant services, such as a sermon and hymns. Many programmed meetings also include a time during the service for silent, expectant waiting and messages from the participants.

Common features

Vocal music is traditionally sung by a choir or the congregation (or a mixture of the two), usually accompanied by an organ.  Sometimes other instruments such as piano, classical instruments, or modern band instruments may be part of the service, especially in churches influenced by the contemporary worship movement. Some churches are equipped with state-of-the-art multi-media equipment to add to the worship experience. The congregation may sing along in hymnals or words to hymns and worship songs may be displayed on a screen. More liturgical denominations may have the words to specific prayers written in a missalette or prayer book, which the congregation follows. Though the majority of services are still conducted in church buildings designed specifically for that purpose, some services take place in "store front" or temporary settings.

For those unable to attend a service in a church building a burgeoning televangelism and radio ministry provides broadcasts of services. A number of websites have been set up as "cyber-churches" to provide a virtual worship space free to anyone on the internet. Church services are often planned and led by a single minister (pastor) or a small group of elders or may follow a format laid out by the dictates of the denomination. 

Some churches are "lay led" with members of the congregation taking turns guiding the service or simply following format that has evolved over time between the active members. More commonly, an ordained minister will preach a sermon (which may cover a specific topic, or as part of a book of the Bible which is being covered over a period of time). Depending on the church, a public invitation follows whereby people are encouraged to become Christians, present themselves as candidates for baptism or to join the congregation (if members elsewhere), or for other purposes. A few begin their church services with the ringing of a bell (or a number of bells); a current trend is to have an introductory video which serves as a "countdown" to the beginning of the service. The service usually involves the singing of hymns, reading of scripture verses and possibly a psalm. If the church follows a lectionary, the sermon will often be about the scripture lections assigned to that day. Eucharistic churches have usually Holy Communion either every Sunday or several Sundays a month. Less liturgical congregations tend to place a greater emphasis on the sermon. Many churches will take up a collection of money (offertory) during the service. But some churches eschew this practice in favor of voluntary anonymous donations for which a box or plate may be set up by the entrance, or return-address envelopes may be provided that worshippers may take with them. Offering through the Internet has become a common practice in many evangelical churches. On occasion, some churches will also arrange a second collection, typically occurring after Communion, for a specific good cause or purpose.

Some churches offer Sunday school classes. These will often be for younger children, and may take place during the whole of the service (while the adults are in church), or the children may be present for the beginning of the service and at a prearranged point leave the service to go to Sunday school. Some churches have adult Sunday school either before or after the main worship service. Following the service, there will often be an opportunity for fellowship in the church hall or other convenient place. This provides the members of the congregation a chance to socialize with each other and to greet visitors or new members. Coffee or other refreshments may be served.

Types of church service
Church services take many forms, and set liturgies may have different names. Services typically include:

Regular Sunday services. These are a part of most traditions. Holy Communion may be celebrated at some or all of these; often it is included either once a month or once a quarter. A few denominations have their main weekly services on Saturday rather than Sunday. Larger churches often tend to have several services each Sunday; often two or three in the morning and one or two in the late afternoon or evening, as well as on Saturdays. Some churches have begun to provide religious services conducted through internet technology, for benefit of those who cannot attend for health or other reasons, or who may want to preview the church before attending in person.
Midweek services. Again, Holy Communion can be part of these, either on every occasion or on a regular basis.
Holiday services. Treated like a regular Sunday service, but made more specific for the day.
Weddings. These are normally separate services, rather than being incorporated into a regular service, but may be either.
Funerals. These are always separate services. 
Baptisms. These may be incorporated into a regular service, or separate.
Confirmation. This is normally incorporated into a regular Sunday service, which will also include communion. It was traditionally the first Communion of the confirmee, but more recently, children are invited to communion in some denominations, whether confirmed or not.
Ordination of clergy. New bishops, elders, priests and deacons are usually ordained or installed generally in a solemn but celebratory ceremony on Saturday or Sunday generally open to the public either by their own superior or another approved senior minister with ordination powers either at the area headquarters church or the cathedral or another church agreed upon by those to be ordained and the ordaining ministers. Ordination of bishops or elders may require consecration by more than one individual and have a more limited audience.   
First Communion. Children may celebrate Communion for the first time.
Opening of new churches or church buildings.
Dedication of new missionaries or those about to be sent on new missions.

Places of worship 

Places of worship are usually called "churches" or "chapels". Some services take place in theaters, schools or multipurpose rooms, rented for Sunday only.

Groups 
IFES are groups of Evangelical students coming together on campuses in 150 countries around the world to share their ideas on the Bible. Full Gospel Business Men's Fellowship International meetings are held in restaurants or hotels and Christian businessmen talk about their faith.

See also
Church attendance
Church membership
Christian liturgy
Canonical hours
Compline
Divine Liturgy
Divine Service (Lutheran)
Evening Prayer (Anglican)
Easter Vigil
Mass (liturgy)
Morning Prayer (Anglican)
Carol service

References

Notes

Citations

External links

Church Service: Nowadays Practice vs. First Century's Practice

Worship (evangelicalism)
 Evangelical ecclesiology
Christian worship and liturgy
Christian practices
Weekly events